Pedro Braz (born June 7, 1985 in Luanda) is an Angolan-American soccer player who played for Gigantes de Carolina and Western Mass Pioneers in the USL Second Division. He is currently the Head Coach for Gallaudet University Men's Soccer team that competes in NCAA Division III.

Career

College and Amateur
Braz attended East Providence High School, where he was a 3x First Team All Area, 2x First Team All State, first-team All-New England selection, and an honorable Mention All American player. He was the captain and team MVP his senior year while playing at East Providence. In his youth he played for E.P. Sporting, where he led his team to 4x L.A.S.A. League Championship and won over 25 tournaments in the span of 4 years. He also played for South Coast Premier (aka 'Scups', now known as Bruno United) and for Bayside United where he led and won State Championship with both teams and scored 40 goals. While playing college soccer at the University of New Hampshire he served as the co-captain his senior year also led UNH defense to school record with the lowest GAA (0.57), and led defense to school record of most shutouts in a season (10). That year (2005) the team was ranked top 25 in the country and #1 ranking in the region. In 2004-2005 Braz, led the team's defense which ranked 4th in the nation in shutouts & goals against average percentage (GAA).

Coaching career
Braz coached at Montgomery College for three seasons (2012 – 2014). He was named 2012 and 2013 NSCAA Junior College Men D3-North Coach of the Year.

Braz was hired as the Gallaudet head coach on September 19, 2014. Braz was named Student-Athlete Admissions Liaison in January 2016.

References

External links
Pioneers bio
Montgomery College

1985 births
Living people
Footballers from Luanda
American people of Angolan descent
American soccer players
USL Second Division players
Expatriate footballers in Puerto Rico
People from East Providence, Rhode Island
Western Mass Pioneers players
Association football defenders